The Kigali Convention Centre is a convention centre in Kigali, the capital and largest city in Rwanda.

Location

Overview
In 2007, three Rwandan corporate investors pooled resources to build the real estate complex. They formed a company called Ultimate Concept Limited, to develop and own the centre. The centre has four major components:
 A 5-star hotel, Radisson Blu Hotel Kigali, with 292 rooms on six floors
 Conference center with seating capacity of 2,600
 A museum on the bottom floor of the IT office park.

Construction began in 2009 and was completed in 2016.

Events 

 2022 Commonwealth Heads of Government Meeting
 African Union Summit in July 8, 2016
 World Economic Forum for Africa 2016
 Transform Africa Summit in October 2013, October 2015 and May 2017

Ownership
Ultimate Concept Limited, the owner-developer of the convention centre, is a Rwandan company whose ownership is as depicted in the table below:

References

External links

 
Radisson Blu kigali

Convention centers in Rwanda
Buildings and structures in Kigali
Event venues in Rwanda
Event venues established in 2016
2016 establishments in Rwanda
Rwandan culture